Anatoli Ivanov may refer to:

 Anatoly Blatov (born Ivanov, 1914–1988), Soviet diplomat and Communist Party official
 Anatoli Ivanov (writer) (1928–1999), Soviet writer
 Anatoli Viktorovich Ivanov (born 1972), Russian footballer with FC Pskov-747
 Anatoli Ivanov (footballer, born 1940), Russian football player and coach
 Anatoly Ivanov (rower) (born 1950), Soviet Olympic rower
 Anatoli Ivanov (musician) (1934–2012), Russian solo-timpanist and percussionist with the Saint Petersburg Philharmonic Orchestra
 Anatoli Ivanov, Soviet actor in Amphibian Man and The Secret of the Iron Door
 Anatoli Aleksandrovich Ivanov (1942–2000), Soviet test pilot, Hero of the Russian Federation
 Anatoli Ivanov (born 1980), French / Russian director of Kvadrat documentary feature film